Showbox Co., Ltd. is a South Korean film distribution and production company. It is one of the largest film distribution companies in South Korea, founded in 1999. Showbox is the film investment, production and distribution branch of Mediaplex, Inc., entertainment arm of Orion Group. Its main competitors for domestic box office are CJ Entertainment, Lotte Entertainment and Next Entertainment World. Despite having very short history in the industry, they managed to have top 6 of 10 blockbusters in Korean box office history, number 1 being 2012's The Thieves.

History 
 June 1996: Establishment of Media Flex Co., Ltd. to enter the movie business.
 November 1999: Establishment of Megabox to enter the movie theater business.
 January 2002: Establishment of ShowBox brand and start of movie distribution investment.
 December 2002: Their first film Sex Is Zero premiers and becomes the fifth most popular film of 2002; selling 4 million tickets.
 February 2004: Taegukgi premiers and hits a new record of 11.74 million tickets sold.
 August 2005: Welcome to Dongmakgol premiers and becomes (at the time) as the fourth highest grossing South Korean film of all time; selling 8 million tickets.
 July 2006: The Host premiers and setting a new record of being (at the time) the highest grossing South Korean film of all time; selling 13 million tickets.
 July 2007: Megabox is sold to Macquarie Investment Fund.
 August 2007:D-War premiers and setting a new record of being (at the time) the highest-budgeted South Korean film of all time; selling 8.42 million tickets.
 February 2008: The Chaser premiers and sells 5 million tickets.
 July 2009: Take Off premiers and becomes the 2nd most attended film of the year in South Korea; selling 8.39 million tickets.
 February 2010: Secret Reunion premiers and becomes one of the highest grossing Korean films of 2010; selling 5.5 million tickets.
 January 2011: Detective K: Secret of the Virtuous Widow premiers and becomes the 4th best selling Korean film of 2011; selling 4.78 million tickets.
 February 2012: Nameless Gangster: Rules of the Time premiers and sells 4.71 million thousand tickets.
 July 2012: The Thieves premiers and becomes (at the time) as the fifth highest-grossing movie in Korean film history; selling 12.9 million tickets.
 May 2013: Secretly, Greatly premiers and breaks several box office records in South Korea: the highest single day opening for a domestic film, most tickets sold in one day for a domestic film, the biggest opening weekend, the highest-grossing webtoon-based film, and the fastest movie to reach the million, two million, three million, and four million marks in audience number; selling 4.71 million tickets.
 September 2013: The Face Reader premiers and became one of the highest-grossing films in South Korea in 2013; selling 9.1 million tickets.
 May 2014: A Hard Day premiers and sells 3.44 million tickets.
 February 2015: Detective K: Secret of the Lost Island premiers and the 9th highest grossing film of 2015; selling 3.87 million tickets.
 March 2015: entered into an exclusive partnership with one of the biggest Chinese entertainment companies, Huayi Brothers, and expanding its way to China and a co-produced partnership with the Hollywood genre movie studio Blumhouse.
 June 2015: Changed the company names from Showbox Mediaplex Co., Inc. to Showbox Co., Ltd., in a step to unify the brand name.
 March 2019: Showbox entered the drama production industry. It signed a consignment deal with generalist network JTBC, being the second film company to do so (the first being NEW).

Releases

Films

Television series

Notes

References 

Orion Group subsidiaries
Film distributors of South Korea
Film production companies of South Korea
Television production companies of South Korea
Mass media companies established in 1999
South Korean companies established in 1999
Companies based in Seoul
International sales agents